AI@50, formally known as the "Dartmouth Artificial Intelligence Conference: The Next Fifty Years" (July 13–15, 2006), was a conference organized by James Moor, commemorating the 50th anniversary of the Dartmouth workshop which effectively inaugurated the history of artificial intelligence.  Five of the original ten attendees were present: Marvin Minsky, Ray Solomonoff, Oliver Selfridge, Trenchard More, and John McCarthy.

While sponsored by Dartmouth College, General Electric, and the Frederick Whittemore Foundation, a $200,000 grant from the Defense Advanced Research Projects Agency (DARPA) called for a report of the proceedings that would:

 Analyze progress on AI's original challenges during the first 50 years, and assess whether the challenges were "easier" or "harder" than originally thought and why
 Document what the AI@50 participants believe are the major research and development challenges facing this field over the next 50 years, and identify what breakthroughs will be needed to meet those challenges
 Relate those challenges and breakthroughs against developments and trends in other areas such as control theory, signal processing, information theory, statistics, and optimization theory.

A summary report by the conference director, James Moor, was published in AI Magazine.

Conference Program and links to published papers 

 James Moor, conference Director, Introduction
 Carol Folt and Barry Scherr, Welcome
 Carey Heckman, Tonypandy and the Origins of Science

AI: Past, Present, Future 

 John McCarthy, What Was Expected, What We Did, and AI Today
 Marvin Minsky, The Emotion Machine

The Future Model of Thinking 

 Ron Brachman and Hector Levesque,  A Large Part of Human Thought
 David Mumford, What is the Right Model for 'Thought'?
 Stuart Russell, The Approach of Modern AI

The Future of Network Models 

 Geoffrey Hinton & Simon Osindero, From Pandemonium to Graphical Models and Back Again
 Rick Granger, From Brain Circuits to Mind Manufacture

The Future of Learning & Search 

 Oliver Selfridge, Learning and Education for Software: New Approaches in Machine Learning
 Ray Solomonoff, Machine Learning — Past and Future 
 Leslie Pack Kaelbling, Learning to be Intelligent
 Peter Norvig, Web Search as a Product of and Catalyst for AI

The Future of AI 

 Rod Brooks, Intelligence and Bodies
 Nils Nilsson, Routes to the Summit
 Eric Horvitz, In Pursuit of Artificial Intelligence: Reflections on Challenges and Trajectories

The Future of Vision 

 Eric Grimson, Intelligent Medical Image Analysis: Computer Assisted Surgery and Disease Monitoring
 Takeo Kanade, Artificial Intelligence Vision: Progress and Non-Progress
 Terry Sejnowski, A Critique of Pure Vision

The Future of Reasoning 

 Alan Bundy, Constructing, Selecting and Repairing Representations of Knowledge
 Edwina Rissland, The Exquisite Centrality of Examples
 Bart Selman, The Challenge and Promise of Automated Reasoning

The Future of Language and Cognition 

 Trenchard More The Birth of Array Theory and Nial
 Eugene Charniak, Why Natural Language Processing is Now Statistical Natural Language Processing
 Pat Langley, Intelligent Behavior in Humans and Machines

The Future of the Future 

 Ray Kurzweil, Why We Can Be Confident of Turing Test Capability Within a Quarter Century 
 George Cybenko, The Future Trajectory of AI
 Charles J. Holland, DARPA's Perspective

AI and Games 

 Jonathan Schaeffer, Games as a Test-bed for Artificial Intelligence Research"
 Danny Kopec, Chess and AI
 Shay Bushinsky, Principle Positions in Deep Junior's Development

Future Interactions with Intelligent Machines 

 Daniela Rus, Making Bodies Smart
 Sherry Turkle, From Building Intelligences to Nurturing Sensibilities

Selected Submitted Papers: Future Strategies for AI 

 J. Storrs Hall, Self-improving AI: An Analysis
 Selmer Bringsjord, The Logicist Manifesto
 Vincent C. Müller, Is There a Future for AI Without Representation?
 Kristinn R. Thórisson, Integrated A.I. Systems

Selected Submitted Papers: Future Possibilities for AI 

 Eric Steinhart, Survival as a Digital Ghost
 Colin T. A. Schmidt, Did You Leave That 'Contraption' Alone With Your Little Sister?
 Michael Anderson & Susan Leigh Anderson, The Status of Machine Ethics
 Marcello Guarini, Computation, Coherence, and Ethical Reasoning

References

External links 
 Dartmouth Artificial Intelligence Conference: The Next Fifty Years.  Official conference Web site.
 James Moor. The Dartmouth College Artificial Intelligence Conference: The Next Fifty Years. AI Magazine 27:4 [2006]: 87–91. ISSN 0738-4602. Official conference report, with photos; freely available online PDF.
 Peter Norvig, Pictures from AI@50. Photographs of conference presenters.

Notes and comments 

Conference blogger Meg Houston Maker provided on-the-scene coverage of the conference, including entries on:
 AI@50 Opening - Brief abstracts of opening remarks, including Carey Heckman's on the original conference and first usage of the term "artificial intelligence"
 AI — Past, Present Future — Brief abstracts of papers by John McCarthy and Marvin Minsky
 The Future Model of Thinking — Brief abstracts of papers by Ron Brachman, David Mumford, and Stuart Russell
 The Future of Network Models — Brief abstracts of papers by Geoffrey Hinton, Simon Odinero, and Rick Granger
 The Future of Learning and Search — Brief abstracts of papers by Oliver Selfridge, Ray Solomonoff, Leslie Pack Kaelbling, and Peter Norvig
 The Future of AI — Brief abstracts of papers by Rod Brooks, Nils Nilsson, and Eric Horvitz
 The Future of Vision — Brief abstracts of papers by Eric Grimson, Takeo Kanade, and Terry Sejnowski
 The Future of Reasoning — Brief abstracts of papers by Alan Bundy, Edwina Rissland, and Bart Selman
 The Future of Language and Cognition — Brief abstracts of papers by Trenchard More, Eugene Charniak, and Pat Langley
 The Future of the Future  — Brief abstract of Ray Kurzweil's paper
 AI and Games — Brief abstracts of papers by Jonathan Schaeffer and Danny Kopec
 Future Interactions with Intelligent Machines — Brief abstracts of papers by Daniela Rus and Sherry Turkle
 Selected Submitted Papers: Future Strategies for AI — Brief abstracts of papers by J. Storrs Hall and Selmer Bringsjord
 Selected Submitted Papers: Future Possibilities for AI — Brief abstracts of papers by Eric Steinhart, C. T. A. Schmidt, Michael Anderson, and Susan Leigh Anderson

Artificial intelligence conferences
Dartmouth College history
History of artificial intelligence